Marilyn L. Huff (born March 6, 1951) is a senior United States district judge of the United States District Court for the Southern District of California.

Education and career

Huff was born in Ann Arbor, Michigan. She received a Bachelor of Arts degree from Calvin College in 1972 and a Juris Doctor from the University of Michigan Law School in 1976. She was in private practice of law in San Diego, California, from 1976 to 1991.

Federal judicial service

Huff was nominated by President George H. W. Bush on March 12, 1991, to a seat on the United States District Court for the Southern District of California vacated by Judge William Benner Enright. She was confirmed by the United States Senate on May 9, 1991, and received her commission on May 14, 1991. She served as Chief Judge from 1998 to 2005. She assumed senior status on September 30, 2016.

As a judge, she has gained a reputation in the field of intellectual property, speaking around the country on the topic.

Notable cases

Lucent Technologies v. Microsoft
This case involved one of the largest awards for a computer code patent infringement in history. The original award was for $368 million. Microsoft made a motion for The final amount awarded with interest was $512 million. The case involved a patent claim involving selecting a date from a pop-up calendar and the use of a stylus.

Cooper v. Brown
After a panel of the Ninth Circuit affirmed Judge Huff's ruling in a death penalty case, the court declined to hear the case en banc over strenuous dissents. In a concurrence, Judge Pamela Ann Rymer praised Judge Huff's "thoughtful 159-page ruling" and "meticulous detail."

Eleven judges vigorously dissented. In unusually strong language, the mild mannered and respected jurist Judge William Fletcher wrote: "There is no way to say this politely. The district court failed to provide Cooper a fair hearing."

Sergeant Gary A. Stein v. United States of America
This case involved a Marine seeking a temporary restraining order against the Marine Corps. Stein stated that the Marine Corps did not follow their own procedures and the timing and content of the administrative separation proceedings were a deliberate attempt to "railroad" Stein by denying him time to prepare a defense or the ability to seek legal counsel. The majority of the complaint was ignored and the motion was denied on the basis that the panel's decision was not a "sure thing" and that Stein was unable to demonstrate irreparable harm.

References

Sources

1951 births
Living people
People from Ann Arbor, Michigan
Judges of the United States District Court for the Southern District of California
United States district court judges appointed by George H. W. Bush
20th-century American judges
University of Michigan Law School alumni
21st-century American judges
20th-century American women judges
21st-century American women judges